Eski Kâhta, formerly Kocahisar, is a village in the Kâhta District, Adıyaman Province, Turkey. The village is populated by Kurds of the Reşwan tribe and had a population of 327 in 2021.

The hamlets of Boğaz, Emekli and Konuklar are attached to Eski Kâhta.

References

Villages in Kâhta District
Kurdish settlements in Adıyaman Province